Michele di Rocco (born 4 May 1982) is an Italian professional boxer of Romani origin. He is a former European and European Union super-lightweight champion, and has challenged once for the WBA super-lightweight title. As an amateur he won a bronze medal at the 2002 European Championships and represented Italy at the 2004 Olympics, both in the lightweight division.

Professional career
On 2 October 2004, di Rocco made his professional debut against Marian Bunea, stopping him in four rounds. He won his first regional championship—the European Union super-lightweight title—on 26 December 2006, defeating Giorgio Marinelli via unanimous decision (UD). One defence of the title was made a month later, on 30 January 2007, when di Rocco travelled to Finland and scored a UD over Juho Tolppola. On 21 September 2007, di Rocco lost his title to veteran and fellow Italian Giuseppe Lauri, who stopped him in seven rounds. In a rematch five years later, on 14 April 2012, di Rocco stopped Lauri in one round to regain his now-vacant title.

Di Rocco's career highlight came on 8 June 2013, when he defeated Lenny Daws via UD to win the vacant European super-lightweight title. However, the decision was highly disputed by Daws. Four successful defences were made of the title over the following two years. On 28 May 2016, di Rocco travelled to Scotland to face former two-weight world champion Ricky Burns, with the vacant WBA super-lightweight title on the line. In a very one-sided fight where di Rocco was knocked down twice, Burns won by stopping him in the eighth round.

Professional boxing record

References

External links

1982 births
Living people
People from Foligno
Sportspeople from the Province of Perugia
Lightweight boxers
Light-welterweight boxers
Boxers at the 2004 Summer Olympics
Olympic boxers of Italy
Italian Romani people
Romani sportspeople
Italian male boxers
European Boxing Union champions
Mediterranean Games bronze medalists for Italy
Competitors at the 2001 Mediterranean Games
Mediterranean Games medalists in boxing